Make the Light is the ninth studio album by folk musician Kate Rusby, released on 22 November 2010 on Pure Records. The album is the first to feature songs written solely by Rusby; this idea was suggested by actress Jennifer Saunders, with whom Rusby had previously worked on the show Jam & Jerusalem.

Self-produced by Rusby with her brother, Joe Rusby, the album features a variety of different musicians, including Rusby's husband, Damien O'Kane. Prior to the album's release, Rusby remarked, "I feel this album is quite different from my others; some of it is gritty, some of it is pretty and some of it is a bit wacky! But what fun we had making it. I hope people enjoy it!"

Track listing
All songs written by Kate Rusby.
"The Wishing Wife" - 3:24
"The Mocking Bird" - 4:07
"Let Them Fly" - 4:25
"Only Hope" - 4:40
"Lately" - 4:52
"Shout to the Devil" - 4:28
"Green Fields" - 5:10
"Fair Weather Friend" - 5:13
"Walk the Road" - 4:18
"Not Me" - 4:20
"Four Stars" - 3:45

Personnel

Musicians
Kate Rusby - vocals, guitar ("Only Hope", "Shout to the Devil", "Not Me", "Four Stars")
Damien O'Kane - guitar, tenor banjo, tenor guitar, electric guitar, backing vocals
Kevin McGuire - double bass
Malcolm Stitt - bouzouki
Julian Sutton - diatonic accordion
John Joe Kelly - bodhran
Donald Shaw - harmonium
Donald Grant - first violin, string arrangements
Catrin Morgan - second violin
Rebecca Jones - viola
Nicholas Trygstad - cello
James Mackintosh - percussion
Rob Westacott - cornet
Andrew Holmes - flugel horn
Jim Fletcher - tenor horn
Michael Dodd - euphonium
Matthew Broadbent - tuba
Helena Smart - second violin
Dave Edmonds - cello
Diane Clark - double bass
Rex Preston - vibraphone
Andy Duncan - brass arrangements

Recording personnel
Kate Rusby - producer
Joe Rubsy - producer, engineer, mixing
Damien O'Kane - assistant producer
Bunt Stafford Clark - mastering

Artwork
Andy Snaith - photography
Jammy Design - design, artwork

References

2010 albums
Kate Rusby albums